Coffee Creek is a census-designated place located within Trinity County in the U.S. state of California. It is located just north of where Coffee Creek flows into the Trinity River along Highway 3 and is the most northern community in Trinity County. It contains the Coffee Creek elementary school. Coffee Creek Road originates at Highway 3 offering access to the interior of the Trinity Alps; the road is 20 miles long, dirt and only for high clearance vehicles. Its population is 152 as of the 2020 census, down from 217 from the 2010 census.

Geography
According to the United States Census Bureau, the CDP covers an area of 11.5 square miles (29.9 km), 99.84% of it land and 0.16% of it water.

Demographics

The 2010 United States Census reported that Coffee Creek had a population of 217. The population density was 18.8 people per square mile (7.3/km). The racial makeup of Coffee Creek was 198 (91.2%) White, 0 (0.0%) African American, 5 (2.3%) Native American, 5 (2.3%) Asian, 0 (0.0%) Pacific Islander, 3 (1.4%) from other races, and 6 (2.8%) from two or more races.  Hispanic or Latino of any race were 16 persons (7.4%).

The Census reported that 186 people (85.7% of the population) lived in households, 31 (14.3%) lived in non-institutionalized group quarters, and 0 (0%) were institutionalized.

There were 85 households, out of which 16 (18.8%) had children under the age of 18 living in them, 48 (56.5%) were opposite-sex married couples living together, 3 (3.5%) had a female householder with no husband present, 4 (4.7%) had a male householder with no wife present.  There were 3 (3.5%) unmarried opposite-sex partnerships, and 0 (0%) same-sex married couples or partnerships. 27 households (31.8%) were made up of individuals, and 14 (16.5%) had someone living alone who was 65 years of age or older. The average household size was 2.19.  There were 55 families (64.7% of all households); the average family size was 2.75.

The population was spread out, with 32 people (14.7%) under the age of 18, 10 people (4.6%) aged 18 to 24, 37 people (17.1%) aged 25 to 44, 84 people (38.7%) aged 45 to 64, and 54 people (24.9%) who were 65 years of age or older.  The median age was 50.2 years. For every 100 females, there were 102.8 males.  For every 100 females age 18 and over, there were 117.6 males.

There were 152 housing units at an average density of 13.2 per square mile (5.1/km), of which 67 (78.8%) were owner-occupied, and 18 (21.2%) were occupied by renters. The homeowner vacancy rate was 1.5%; the rental vacancy rate was 10.0%.  151 people (69.6% of the population) lived in owner-occupied housing units and 35 people (16.1%) lived in rental housing units.

Politics

See also
Trinity County, California

References

External links
Coffee Creek description on Trinity County official website

Census-designated places in Trinity County, California
Census-designated places in California